Chlorochrysa is a genus of small colourful Neotropical birds in the tanager family  Thraupidae.

Taxonomy and species list
The genus Chlorochrysa was introduced in 1851 by the French naturalist Charles Lucien Bonaparte. In a subsequent publication he designated the type species as the orange-eared tanager. The name combines the Ancient Greek khlōros meaning "green" and khrusos meaning "gold". The genus contains three species.

References

 
Bird genera
Taxa named by Charles Lucien Bonaparte